Founded in 2002 by Stages Theatre Company and the Hopkins School District, the Performing Institute of Minnesota Arts High School (PiM Arts High School), formerly Main Street School of Performing Arts, is a tuition free public charter school for grades 9 through 12, sponsored by the University of St. Thomas, and located in Eden Prairie, Minnesota, United States.

PiM Arts High School is open to all high school students throughout the metro area and meets all graduation requirements of the State of Minnesota. The school offers Advanced Placement classes in all academic areas, as well as beginning through advanced level classes in 7 different fields; Media Arts, Visual Arts, Vocal Music, Instrumental Music, Theatre, Musical Theatre, and Dance.

PiM was a silver award winner in U.S. News & World Report's Best High School Rankings for 2012 and also received a Reward School 2012 recognition from the Minnesota Department of Education.

Location 
PiM Arts High School is located on Flying Cloud Drive in Eden Prairie, Minnesota. The building consists of a bottom level (the main bulk of the building) and a small trapezoid of second level (for math and science classes).

Activities 
At PiM Arts High School there are many opportunities for new students including art showcases, No Shames, plays, dances, musicals, and galleries. There have also been several outreach opportunities such as painting murals after the murder of George Floyd and subsequent protests.

Students 
PiM Arts High School enrolls approximately 300 students annually. Class size averages 10 to 30 students.

References

External links

Public high schools in Minnesota
Schools in Hennepin County, Minnesota
Charter schools in Minnesota
2002 establishments in Minnesota
Educational institutions established in 2002